Kristy Hanson is an American
singer-songwriter, who has released a number of folk-pop albums.

Background
Hanson was born in Cleveland, Ohio, where she lived in the Shaker Heights area. Her family moved to south Florida in 1986. She attended the University of Michigan in Ann Arbor from 1999 to 2004, earning degrees in English Language and Literature and vocal performance and studying with former Metropolitan Opera diva Shirley Verrett. 
 
Hanson performed in school and All-State choirs as a child, and began studying voice at 12. She began performing her own songs and other folk music in bookstores and coffee houses as a high school student, after having taken up guitar. Her initial influences included Joni Mitchell, Joan Baez and current folk artists such as the Indigo Girls. Throughout college she performed at Ann Arbor venues, most notably The Blind Pig, and put on several concerts for University of Michigan students. It was during her college years that she released her first two albums, Half the Moon (2001) and She's Been Waiting (2003).
 
She performs throughout the country, often with other female artists, and she works actively to promote other independent artists as a performing member of Indiegrrl and as the Media/PR Coordinator for Songsalive.

Discography
 Half the Moon (2001)
 She's Been Waiting, Relay Records (2003)
 Already Gone (2007)
 Into the Quiet (2010)

References

External links 
 Kristy Hanson official website
 [ Allmusic Page]

Living people
1981 births
American women singer-songwriters
American folk singers
American folk guitarists
Singer-songwriters from Ohio
Singer-songwriters from Michigan
University of Michigan College of Literature, Science, and the Arts alumni
Guitarists from Michigan
Guitarists from Ohio
21st-century American women singers
21st-century American women guitarists
21st-century American guitarists
University of Michigan School of Music, Theatre & Dance alumni
21st-century American singers